Encinitas Union School District is a public (elementary) school district in San Diego County, California, United States.

The EUSD district operates nine elementary schools and one additional property:

 Capri Elementary School
 El Camino Creek Elementary School
 Flora Vista Elementary School
 La Costa Heights Elementary School
 Mission Estancia Elementary School
 Ocean Knoll Elementary School
 Olivenhain Pioneer Elementary School
 Park Dale Lane Elementary School
 Paul Ecke Central Elementary School
 Farm Lab DREAMS Campus

References

External links
 

School districts in San Diego County, California
1883 establishments in California
School districts established in 1883